Dichlorotetrakis(dimethyl sulfoxide) ruthenium(II) describes coordination compounds with the formula RuCl2(dmso)4, where DMSO is dimethylsulfoxide.  Both cis and trans isomers are known, but the cis isomer is more common.  The cis isomer is a yellow, air-stable solid that is soluble in some organic solvents.  These compounds have attracted attention as possible anti-cancer drugs.

Structure and synthesis
The cis isomer illustrates linkage isomerism for the DMSO ligand.  One of the two dmso ligands that are cis to both chloride ligands is O-bonded while the other three dmso ligands are S-bonded.  In the trans isomer, which is also yellow, all four dmso ligands are S-bonded.  The cis isomer is formed thermally, and the trans isomer is obtained by UV-irradiation of the cis isomer.

The complexes were first prepared by heating DMSO solutions of ruthenium trichloride under hydrogen atmosphere. An alternative procedure has been developed which avoids hydrogen gas.

Potential applications
RuCl2(dmso)4 was identified as a potential anticancer agent in the early 1980s. Continued research has led to the development of several related dmso-containing ruthenium compounds, some of which have undergone early-stage clinical trials.

References

Coordination complexes
Ruthenium complexes
Chloro complexes
Sulfoxides
Ruthenium(II) compounds